is a Japanese manga artist.
He is well known for science fiction comics, allegorical comics and horror/mystery comics based on pseudohistory and folklore.
The indirect influence by Cthulhu Mythos also appears here and there in his works.

Biography 
Morohoshi grew up in Adachi-ku, Tokyo.
After graduating from high school, he worked for the Tokyo metropolitan government for three years.

In 1970, Morohoshi made his professional debut with his short story  in COM. In 1974, his short story  was selected in the 7th Tezuka Award.

His breakthrough came, when he started publishing the series  in Weekly Shōnen Jump. He published ,  in the same magazine afterwards. In 1979, he published the Mud Men series in Monthly Shōnen Champion Zōkan.

In 1983, he published  (The Monkey King and other Chinese Legends) based on Journey to the West in Super Action. This work won him the grand prize of the fourth Tezuka Osamu Cultural Prize in 2000.

Style and themes 
Morohoshi takes inspiration from ancient history, mythology and folklore, influenced by the essays of Tatsuhiko Shibusawa. Yōkai Hunter revolves around archeologists discovering strange incidents around Japan, Mad Men shows myths from Papua New Guinea clashing with modernity and Saiyū Yōenden is based on the classic Chinese fantasy novel Journey to the West.

His drawing style is inspired by Western artists such as Salvador Dalí, whom he cites as his favaorite painter, but his work also includes references to Hieronymus Bosch, Francisco Goya and Giorgio de Chirico.

Morohoshi's style is perceived as unique in the manga industry. In a roundtable discussion between Morohoshi, Yukinobu Hoshino and Osamu Tezuka, Tezuka said that he could not imitate Morohoshi's painting.

Legacy 
Morohoshi has been a key influence to two important anime directors of the 1980s and 1990s, Hayao Miyazaki and Hideaki Anno. Miyazaki mentioned that he was strongly influenced by Morohoshi. His 1997 film Princess Mononoke has references to Mud Men. When Kentaro Takekuma interviewed Miyazaki, he said that he actually wanted Morohoshi to draw Nausicaä of the Valley of the Wind. According to Toshio Okada, who was a former representative director of Gainax, Hideaki Anno always said that he wanted to apply the scene where a giant appeared in Morohoshi's  to his work, and his hope was realized in Neon Genesis Evangelion.

His style has inspired also musicians. Morohoshi's Mud Men triggered Haruomi Hosono of Yellow Magic Orchestra, and Hosono wrote "The Madmen" for the album Service. Hosono said that his production company misspelled "Mudmen" with "Madmen".

His work has gained some international attention since the 2000s. Manga of his have been translated into French and Spanish.

Awards 

|-
| style="text-align:center;"| 1974
| style="text-align:left;"| "Seibutsu Toshi"
| The 7th Tezuka Award
|
|-
| rowspan="2" style="text-align:center;"| 1992
| style="text-align:left;"| Boku to Furio to Kōtei de
| The excellence prize of The 21st Japan Cartoonists Association Award
|
|-
| style="text-align:left;"| Morokai Shii: Ikairoku
| The excellence prize of The 21st Japan Cartoonists Association Award
|
|-
| style="text-align:center;"| 2000
| style="text-align:left;"| Saiyū Yōenden
| The grand prize of the 4th Tezuka Osamu Cultural Prize
|
|-
| style="text-align:center;"| 2008
| style="text-align:left;"| Shiori to Shimiko
| Excellent prize of the 12th Japan Media Arts Festival Manga section
|
|-
| style="text-align:center;"| 2014
| style="text-align:left;"| Uriko-hime no Yoru, Cinderella no Asa
| Award for the Media Arts division at the 64th Annual MEXT Art Encouragement Prizes
|

Selected works

Manga

Novels 
 Kyōko no Kyō wa Kyōfu no Kyō (2004)
 Kumo no Ito wa Kanarazu Kireru (2007)

Illustrations for books 
 Rōkō ni Ari (Author: Ken'ichi Sakemi)

Adaptations

Movies 
 Hiruko the Goblin (1991, Film Director: Shinya Tsukamoto)
 Kidan (2005, Film Director: Takashi Komatsu)
 Kabeotoko (British title: The Wall Man) (2007, Film Director: Wataru Hayakawa)

TV drama 
 Fukushū Club (1991, Fuji Television, in Yo nimo Kimyo na Monogatari)
 Shiro (1992, Fuji Television, in Yo nimo Kimyo na Monogatari)
 Shiori to Shimiko no Kaiki Jikenbo (2008, Nippon Television)

Radio drama 
 Saiyū Yōenden (1989)
 Zoku Saiyū Yōenden (1990)
 Yumemiru Kikai (2000)

OVA 
 Ankoku Shinwa (The Dark Myth) Chapter 1/Chapter 2 (1990)

Video games 
 Ankoku Shinwa: Yamato Takeru Densetsu (1988)

References

External links 

 
 List of works at ne.jp/asahi
 Hiruko/Yōkai Hunter (movie)
 Daijiro Morohoshi Museum

1949 births
Cthulhu Mythos writers
Japanese horror fiction
Japanese horror writers
Living people
Manga artists from Nagano Prefecture